Fahizah is the second EP by the American punk rock band Pinhead Gunpowder. It was released in 1992 through Lookout! Records, their first release for the label.

Track listing

Personnel
 Aaron Cometbus - drums
 Billie Joe Armstrong - guitar, vocals
 Sarah Kirsch - guitar, vocals
 Bill Schneider - bass, backing vocals

Production
 Kevin Army - production
 Aaron Cometbus - cover art, graphic design

References

Pinhead Gunpowder albums
1992 EPs
Lookout! Records EPs